Giovanna Mezzogiorno (born 9 November 1974) is an Italian theatre and film actress.

Early life
Mezzogiorno was born in Rome, 9 November 1974, a daughter of actors Vittorio Mezzogiorno and Cecilia Sacchi. She grew up watching her parents on set. At first, she wanted to become a ballerina, and she studied dancing for 13 years. After her father's death when she was 19, Mezzogiorno moved to Paris, where she attended the stages by Arianne Mnouchkine and worked for two years at the Peter Brook Workshop. She made her stage debut with the role of Ofelia in Qui est là, based on Shakespeare's Hamlet. The play toured various European cities. She received the Premio Coppola-Prati 1996, the jury was presided over by theatre critic Franco Quadri.  One year later, she made her film debut in Il viaggio della sposa (The Bride's Journey), written by and starring Sergio Rubini. Mezzogiorno was awarded the Targa d'Argento as the New Talent in Italian Cinema, she was also given the Grolla d'oro, and the Globo d'Oro by the Foreign Press Association and the Premio Flaiano as Best Actress of the 1997 - 1998 season.

Career

In 1998, she starred in the film Del perduto amore directed by Michele Placido, with Fabrizio Bentivoglio and Sergio Rubini (she was awarded the Nastro d'Argento, the Ciak d'Oro and Premio Pasinetti as best actress in a starring role) and, for the Italian National Television Network RaiDue, in a film made-for-TV Più leggero non basta ("A lighter burden to bear") in the role of a young girl with muscular dystrophy, directed by Elisabetta Lodoli with Stefano Accorsi.

In 1999, she played the role of Silvia, daughter of Enzo Tortora by whose mistaken conviction the film was inspired. The film Un uomo perbene with Michele Placido and Mariangela Melato, was directed by Maurizio Zaccaro. In that same year, she worked in Asini, directed by Antonello Grimaldi, with celebrated Italian comedian Claudio Bisio.

In 2000, she travelled between Prague and Paris for work in the TV miniseries Les Miserables, directed by Josée Dayan, with Gérard Depardieu and John Malkovich. She worked in Denmark in Nobel, directed by Fabio Carpi, with Héctor Alterio. In Italy, she worked with Puglielli in Tutta la conoscenza del mondo ("All There Is to Know"), and then, L'ultimo bacio ("The Last Kiss") directed by Gabriele Muccino with Stefano Accorsi and Stefania Sandrelli (winning the Premio Flaiano). With the success of this last movie Giovanna become really famous in Italy.

In 2001, she worked in the film Malefemmene with Ángela Molina and directed by Fabio Conversi, in the role of Francesca, who was imprisoned following a judicial error and came into contact with the reality of friendship and attachment which she had never imagined possible. She also worked on Stai con me, with Adriano Giannini and directed by Livia Giampalmo, in the role of a mother of twins.

In 2002, she worked on the set of Ilaria Alpi - Il più crudele dei giorni, in the role of the protagonist, directed by Ferdinando Vicentini Orgnani (the film tells the tragic and dark story of the Italian TV journalist killed in Mogadiscio). She also starred in France in the Holocaust-period TV drama Entrusted, directed by Giacomo Battiato, with Klaus Maria Brandauer, Thomas Brodie-Sangster and Steven Moyer, based on Loup Duran's best-seller. In Italy, she starred in the film La finestra di fronte ("Facing windows") directed by Ferzan Özpetek, costarring Massimo Girotti and Raoul Bova. This film, critically acclaimed and a box office success, earned her a lot of awards: the David di Donatello, the Ciak d’Oro, the Nastro d'Argento, the Globo d'oro by the Foreign Press, the Flaiano Award, the Karlovy Vary Award as "Best Actress in a Leading Role".

Lately, she starred in the film L’amore ritorna, directed by Sergio Rubini, costarring Fabrizio Bentivoglio and Margherita Buy. She was also working in France, on the set of her first comedy: Au secours, j'ai 30 ans, directed by Marie-Anne Chazel, with Pierre Palmade.

Then, in 2004, Giovanna worked in the TV movie Virginia (La monaca di Monza), directed by Alberto Sironi. She then returned to the theatre, working with the director Piero Maccarinelli in 4.48 Psicosi, written by Sarah Kane.

In 2005, La bestia nel cuore ("Don't Tell"), directed by Cristina Comencini, was an Academy Award candidate for Best Foreign Language Film and earned Giovanna one of the most important international prizes for an actress: the Coppa Volpi, previously won by Shirley MacLaine, Gong Li, Isabelle Huppert, Catherine Deneuve and Sophia Loren.

Then in 2006, she acted in AD Project, a sci-fi thriller by Eros Puglielli, and acted in "Lezioni di Volo" ("Flying Lessons") by Francesca Archibugi.

In 2007, she became Leila, a sexy thief, in the black comedy Notturno Bus ("Night Bus"), directed by Davide Marengo and starring Valerio Mastandrea and Ennio Fantastichini.

She travelled to Colombia to become Fermina Daza, the principal female character from Love in the Time of Cholera based on the book written by Nobel Prize winner Gabriel García Márquez and directed by Mike Newell (Four Weddings and a Funeral).

After two films shot in 2008, Sono Viva and Palermo Shooting by Wim Wenders, in 2009 she achieved great international success with Vincere by Marco Bellocchio, selected for the official competition in Cannes and a solid candidate for the final award.

She has voiced and produced a documentary to celebrate the career of her father Vittorio, 15 years after his sudden death in 1994.

She was a member of the jury at the Cannes Film Festival in May 2010. In January 2011, she was rewarded with the National Society of Film Critics Award for Best Actress 2010 for her role in Vincere.

In 2017, she appeared in a role of Adriana in a film called Napoli velata.

She has two sons, Leone and Zeno, born 26 August 2011.

Personal life
On the set of the film Lighter is not Enough (1998) she met Stefano Accorsi, who became her partner for a long time. On the set of Vincere she met the driver Alessio Fugolo, whom she married in 2009 in Griante with a civil ceremony. She has two children with him.

Filmography

References

External links
Saverio Ferragina press agent

1974 births
Living people
20th-century Italian actresses
21st-century Italian actresses
Actresses from Rome
David di Donatello winners
Italian film actresses
Italian stage actresses
Nastro d'Argento winners
Ciak d'oro winners
Volpi Cup for Best Actress winners
People of Campanian descent
People of Venetian descent